Sue Cheung (Chinese name: Cheung Ying Yee), formerly known as Sue Pickford, is a novelist. She is best known for her first novel Chinglish.

Biography
Cheung was born in Nottingham, England, to parents who had emigrated from Hong Kong in the 1960s. They ran a Chinese restaurant in Nottingham, and when she was nine started running a butchers shop in Hull. They then moved to Coventry, where the family lived in a Chinese takeaway for most of her teen years. Despite her parents coming from Hong Kong, she has never been to Hong Kong, in part due to her parents’ working schedule. 

At the age of 16, she won a scholarship at the London College of Fashion to study to become an artist. She subsequently worked in advertising as an Art Director before switching to freelance design.

Her first novel for teenagers, Chinglish, is based on her experiences growing up in the takeaway in Coventry. It won several prizes, including the 2019 Guardian’s Best Books list, the ‘Simply the Book’ category at the Coventry Inspiration Book Awards, and the Young Adult category the Diverse Book Awards.

Works

Novel
 Cheung, Sue (2019). Chinglish. London: Anderson Press. ISBN 9781783448395

Picture books
 Pickford, Sue (2019). Chill with Lil. Sherborne: Ragged Bears Publishing Limited. ISBN 9781857144710
 Pickford, Sue (2015). When Angus Met Alvin. London: Frances Lincoln Children's Books. ISBN 9781847805249
 Pickford, Sue (2015). Far from Home. North brook, IL: Pearson Scott Foresman. ISBN 9780328832736
 Pickford, Sue (2014). Bob and Rob. London: Frances Lincoln Children's Books. ISBN 9781847803436

References

External links
 

Writers from Nottingham
Living people
Alumni of the London College of Fashion
Chinese diaspora in Europe
British people of Hong Kong descent
Year of birth missing (living people)